Briarcliff most commonly refers to:

 Briarcliff Manor, New York, a village in Westchester County
 Briarcliff College, a college in the village that closed in 1977
 Briarcliff Farms, a dairy farm in the village and Pine Plains from 1890 to 1968
 Briarcliff High School, the village public high school
 Briarcliff Lodge, a historic resort in the village, demolished 2003
 Briarcliff Manor Fire Department, the village volunteer fire department
 Briarcliff Manor Union Free School District, the village public school district
 Briarcliff Middle School, the village public middle school

Briarcliff may also refer to:

Geography

Cities and Communities
 Briarcliff, Arkansas
 Briarcliff, more commonly known as North Druid Hills
 Briarcliff High School (DeKalb County, Georgia), a former high school that was closed in 1987
 Briarcliff, a residential neighborhood and shopping district in Kansas City, Missouri
 Briarcliff, Seattle
 Briarcliff, Texas

Buildings
 Briarcliff (mansion), formerly the home of Asa G. Candler, Jr., son of a founder of Coca-Cola
 Briarcliff Hotel, apartment building and former hotel in Virginia Highland, Atlanta, Georgia
 Briarcliff Plaza, a historic shopping center on Ponce de Leon Avenue in Poncey-Highland, Atlanta, Georgia

Streets
 Briarcliff Road, a street that goes through Atlanta, Druid Hills, and adjacent communities in DeKalb County, Georgia

Ships and vehicles
 USS Briarcliff (IX-3), a US Naval vessel from 1919 to 1938

Television
 "Welcome to Briarcliff", the premiere of American Horror Story's second season

See also
 Briarcliffe College
 Briarcliffe Acres, South Carolina
 Briar Cliff University